= Tasteit App =

- Company type: Social Network/App
- Founded: 2023; 3 years ago
- Founders: Giorgi Urushadze, Teona Gongladze, Anano Aspanidze, Pavle Tabatadze, Ketevan Kvartskhava, Pavle Mgeladze
- Headquarters: Tbilisi, Georgia, Georgia
- Area served: Georgia, Germany
- Key people: Giorgi Urushadze (CEO)
- Website: tasteit.me

Tasteit App is a social network for food lovers that connects people based on their culinary tastes.

The app launched in Georgia on 18 August 2023 and in Germany on 10 July 2024. Unlike dating apps, users browse dishes instead of profiles. Connections are made only when two users like the same dish, after which they can exchange messages. Food establishments upload the dishes and manage profiles with menus, photos, and offers.

As of September 2024, Tasteit has 50,000 active users — 40,000 in Georgia and 10,000 in Germany.

== History ==
Tasteit was founded in 2021 in Tbilisi by Georgian art director Giorgi Urushadze, later securing investment on Shark Tank Georgia. In 2023, it won a 150,000 GEL grant from Georgia's Innovation and Technology Agency.

In 2024, the app joined Early Bird's Vision Lab acceleration program and expanded to the German market, also introducing a Dining Mode for organizing food and drink events.

In 2025, Tasteit App won the Startup World Cup Regional Competition and was selected by TechCrunch as one of the 200 most promising early-stage startups worldwide.
